The Labor Party was a Salvadoran political party that existed from 1930 to 1931.

The party was founded by Arturo Araujo in 1930. The party joined a coalition with Maximiliano Hernández Martínez's National Republican Party during the 1931 general election. The coalition failed to win a majority but Araujo was elected president by the Legislative Assembly.

The party dissolved following the 1931 Salvadoran coup d'état when all political parties were banned.

Electoral history

Presidential elections

Legislative Assembly elections

Labor Presidents of El Salvador

See also 

1931 Salvadoran general election
National Republican Party (El Salvador)

References 

1930s establishments in El Salvador
1930s disestablishments in El Salvador
Defunct political parties in El Salvador
Political parties established in 1930
Political parties disestablished in 1931
Labour parties
Banned political parties